Nanna diplisticta is a moth of the subfamily Arctiinae. It was described by George Thomas Bethune-Baker in 1911. It is found in Angola, Cameroon and Nigeria.

References

 Natural History Museum Lepidoptera generic names catalog

Lithosiini
Moths described in 1911